June 10 - Eastern Orthodox Church calendar - June 12

All fixed commemorations below celebrated on June 24 by Orthodox Churches on the Old Calendar.

For June 11th, Orthodox Churches on the Old Calendar commemorate the Saints listed on May 29.

Saints
 Holy Apostles Bartholomew and Barnabas (1st century)
 Martyr Theopemptus and four others, by the sword.

Pre-Schism Western saints
 Saints Felix and Fortunatus, two brothers, born in Vicenza in Italy, who suffered under Diocletian in Aquileia (296)
 Saint Blitharius (Blier), born in Scotland, he went to France and settled in Seganne in Champagne (7th century)
 Saint Herebald (Herband), born in Britain, he lived as a hermit in Brittany where a church is dedicated to him (8th century)
 Saint Tochumra, a holy virgin venerated in Kilmore in Ireland; she was called on by women in labour.

Post-Schism Orthodox saints
 Venerable Barnabas of Vasa, near Limassol in Cyprus, Wonderworker.{{#tag:ref|A Cypriot chronographer has written that it is possible that St. Barnabas of Vasa was one of the "300 Allemagne Saints" who settled in Cyprus in the 12th century. The 300 Allemagne Saints came to Cyprus from Palestine and lived as ascetics in various parts of the island.|group=note}}
 Venerable Barnabas of Vetluga, ascetic of Vetluga (1445)Venerable Barnabas the Abbot of Vetluga. OCA - Lives of the Saints.

New martyrs and confessors
 New Martyr Zafeirios of Halkidiki (c. 1821)Holy New Martyr Zafeirios of Halkidiki (+ c. 1821). Mystagogy Resource Center. June 11, 2013. Retrieved: 15 September 2017. 
 222 Chinese New Martyrs of the Boxer Uprising, at Beijing and other places (1900):Great Synaxaristes:  Ὁ Ἅγιος Μητροφάνης ὁ Ἱερομάρτυρας καὶ οἱ σὺν αὐτῷ μαρτυρήσαντες. 11 ΙΟΥΝΙΟΥ. ΜΕΓΑΣ ΣΥΝΑΞΑΡΙΣΤΗΣ. 
 Hieromartyr Metrophanes, Chi Sung (Chang Tzi-tzung), Priest; 
 his wife Presvytera Tatiana; 
 his sons John and Isaiah, and Isaiah’s fiancée Maria; 
 the church-school teachers Paul Wang and Ia Wen;
 and another 215 martyrs.
 New Hiero-confessor Luke (Voino-Yasenetsky), Archbishop of Simferopol and Crimea, Surgeon, Unmercenary Wonderworker (1961)Great Synaxaristes:  Ὁ Ἅγιος Λουκᾶς Ἀρχιεπίσκοπος Κριμαίας. 11 ΙΟΥΝΙΟΥ. ΜΕΓΑΣ ΣΥΝΑΞΑΡΙΣΤΗΣ. (see also May 29 )

Other commemorations
 Appearance of the Archangel Gabriel to a monk on Mt. Athos, and the revelation of the hymn "It Is Truly Meet" (Axion Estin) (982)Great Synaxaristes:  Σύναξις Ὑπεραγίας Θεοτόκου τοῦ «Ἄξιόν Ἐστιν» ἐν Ἁγίῳ Ὄρει. 11 ΙΟΥΝΙΟΥ. ΜΕΓΑΣ ΣΥΝΑΞΑΡΙΣΤΗΣ.
 Icon of the Most Holy Theotokos "It Is Truly Meet" (Axion Estin) (10th century)Icon of the Mother of God “It Is Truly Meet”. OCA - Lives of the Saints.
 Translation of the relics (1572) of St. Ephraim of Novotorzhk, founder of the Sts. Boris and Gleb Monastery, Novotorzhok (1053)Great Synaxaristes:  Μετακομιδὴ Τιμίων Λειψάνων Ὁσίου Ἐφραὶμ ἐκ Ρωσίας. 11 ΙΟΥΝΙΟΥ. ΜΕΓΑΣ ΣΥΝΑΞΑΡΙΣΤΗΣ. ЕФРЕМ. Православная Энциклопедия под редакцией Патриарха Московского и всея Руси Кирилла (электронная версия). (Orthodox Encyclopedia - Pravenc.ru).
 Translation of the relics (c. 1592) of Saint Arcadius of Vyazma and Novotorzhk (1077)
 Repose of the recluse Melania of Eletz and Zadonsk (1836)
 Repose of Ivan Vasilievich Kireyevsky, philosopher and Patristic translator (1856)

Icon gallery

Notes

References

Sources
 June 11/24. Orthodox Calendar (PRAVOSLAVIE.RU).
 June 24 / June 11. HOLY TRINITY RUSSIAN ORTHODOX CHURCH (A parish of the Patriarchate of Moscow).
 June 11. OCA - The Lives of the Saints.
 The Autonomous Orthodox Metropolia of Western Europe and the Americas (ROCOR). St. Hilarion Calendar of Saints for the year of our Lord 2004. St. Hilarion Press (Austin, TX). p. 43.
 The Eleventh Day of the Month of June. Orthodoxy in China.
 June 11. Latin Saints of the Orthodox Patriarchate of Rome.
 The Roman Martyrology. Transl. by the Archbishop of Baltimore. Last Edition, According to the Copy Printed at Rome in 1914. Revised Edition, with the Imprimatur of His Eminence Cardinal Gibbons. Baltimore: John Murphy Company, 1916. p. 170.
 Rev. Richard Stanton. A Menology of England and Wales, or, Brief Memorials of the Ancient British and English Saints Arranged According to the Calendar, Together with the Martyrs of the 16th and 17th Centuries. London: Burns & Oates, 1892. p. 265.
Greek Sources
 Great Synaxaristes:  11 ΙΟΥΝΙΟΥ. ΜΕΓΑΣ ΣΥΝΑΞΑΡΙΣΤΗΣ.
  Συναξαριστής. 11 Ιουνίου. ECCLESIA.GR. (H ΕΚΚΛΗΣΙΑ ΤΗΣ ΕΛΛΑΔΟΣ). 
  11/06/2017.'' Ορθόδοξος Συναξαριστής. Russian Sources'''
  24 июня (11 июня). Православная Энциклопедия под редакцией Патриарха Московского и всея Руси Кирилла (электронная версия). (Orthodox Encyclopedia - Pravenc.ru).
  11 июня по старому стилю / 24 июня по новому стилю. Русская Православная Церковь - Православный церковный календарь на 2017 год.
  11 июня (ст.ст.) 24 июня 2014 (нов. ст.). Русская Православная Церковь Отдел внешних церковных связей. (DECR).

June in the Eastern Orthodox calendar